Java School No. 1 is a historic school in Java, Wyoming County, New York.  It is a two-story frame structure in the Italian Villa style.  It features a four sided, square cupola at the apex of the roof.  It was built about 1850 and operated as a school until 1967.  In 1969, the building was occupied by the local Grange and now also houses the Java Historical Society Museum, a local history museum that is open by appointment.

It was listed on the National Register of Historic Places in 2001.

References

External links
Java School No. 1 - Java Village, New York - U.S. National Register of Historic Places on Waymarking.com
Wyoming County Museums & Galleries - includes information on the Java Historical Society Museum

Museums in Wyoming County, New York
School buildings on the National Register of Historic Places in New York (state)
History museums in New York (state)
Italianate architecture in New York (state)
Education museums in the United States
Historical society museums in New York (state)
National Register of Historic Places in Wyoming County, New York